Kanjiroba (Nepali: कान्जिरोबा) is a mountain in the Himalayas of Dolpa District in Nepal.

Location 

Climbing history 
In 1970, the Osaka City University Himalayan Expedition successfully climbed Kanjiroba's principal peak by traversing Patrasi Himal for the first time.

See also
 List of mountains in Nepal
 List of Ultras of the Himalayas

References

External links
 "Kanjiroba, Nepal" on Peakbagger

Six-thousanders of the Himalayas
Mountains of the Karnali Province